Khaled S. Mekheimer is an Egyptian professor of Applied Mathematics at the Department of Mathematics Faculty of Science (Men), Al-Azhar University, Egypt. He is the  Vice Dean of Research and Post-graduate Studies of the Faculty. He is an elected member of African Academy of sciences and Egyptian Mathematical Society.

Early life and education 
Mekheimer was born on March 22, 1963 in Egypt. He obtained his BSc from the department of mathematics, Faculty of Science, Ain-Shams University in 1984. He moved to Al-Azhar University for his MSc and PhD and he graduated in 1990 and 1994 respectively.

Career 
Mekheimer started his career in 1986 as a demonstrator of Mathematics at Al-Azhar, University , Cairo, Egypt. He became an assistant lecturer immediately after his MSc in 1990 and assumed the role of a lecturer after his PhD in 1994. In 1997, he moved to King Abdu Al-Aziz University branch, Madinah Munawwara, Saudi Arabia where he became an assistant Professor. He returned to Al-Azhar University in Cairo as an associate professor and in 2010 he became a Professor of Applied Mathematics at the Faculty of Science in the same institution.

References 

21st-century Egyptian mathematicians
20th-century Egyptian mathematicians
1963 births
Living people
Academic staff of King Abdulaziz University